was a Japanese daimyō of the mid to late Edo period, who ruled the Nishio Domain. Norihiro held a variety of positions in the Tokugawa shogunate, including rōjū and Kyoto Shoshidai.

He was the father of Makino Tadayuki, another holder of the Kyoto Shoshidai office.

|-

1778 births
1839 deaths
Daimyo
Kyoto Shoshidai
Rōjū
Ogyū-Matsudaira clan